Berat is a city in south Albania.

Berat may also refer to:

 Berat County, an administrative county surrounding Berat
 Berat District, a former administrative district surrounding Berat
 Berat, Queensland, a locality in Australia
 Bérat, a commune in Haute-Garonne, France

See also 
 Beratlı